Pei Xinyi (born 1 October 2005) is a Chinese weightlifter World Champion, competing in the 64 kg division.

At the 2022 World Weightlifting Championships in Bogotá she set 5 youth world records in the 64 kg category.

Achievements

References

External links 
 

Living people
2005 births
Place of birth missing (living people)
Chinese female weightlifters
World Weightlifting Championships medalists
21st-century Chinese women